Harold Costley-White (9 November 1878 – 5 April 1966) was an Anglican dean and author in the mid-20th century.

He was educated at Malvern and Balliol and ordained in 1902. He was an Assistant Master at Sherborne and Rugby. From 1910 to 1936 he held Headships at Bradfield College, Liverpool College and Westminster, where he was a member of the Old Westminsters' Lodge. In 1936 he became Canon of Westminster and two years later Dean of Gloucester, serving for 15 years. He died in Wells, Somerset, in 1966 and was buried at Westminster Abbey.

References

1878 births
People educated at Malvern College
Alumni of Balliol College, Oxford
Deans of Gloucester
1966 deaths
Canons of Westminster
Head Masters of Westminster School
Headmasters of Bradfield College
Place of birth missing

19th-century Anglican theologians
20th-century Anglican theologians